Rheidol power station is a 56MW hydroelectric scheme near Aberystwyth, Wales. It was built between 1957 and 1962 and was officially opened on 3 July 1964.  It has been operated by Statkraft since 2009 after it was transferred from E.ON UK as part of a swap for shares. In 1964/65 Rheidol Power Station was awarded the Christopher Hinton trophy in recognition of good housekeeping.

The power plant is the largest of its kind in England and Wales. The plant has generated renewable energy by using rainwater that falls on the surrounding mountains since 1962. A series of aqueducts collects the water and channels it into the Nant-y-Moch reservoir. Water flows from this reservoir to a power station at Dinas where it drives a 13MW generator. From the power station, the water flows into Dinas reservoir. Dinas reservoir supplies water to the largest power station at Cwm Rheidol where there are two 20.5MW generators. At Cwm Rheidol a further reservoir has been created to avoid large variations in the flow of water. This reservoir collects water that flows through the power station and releases it slowly through a 1MW generator.

References

External links
 
 
 

 

Hydroelectric power stations in Wales
Buildings and structures in Ceredigion